The Hugues C. Pernath-prijs (Dutch for Hugues C. Pernath Prize) is a Belgian literary award named after Flemish poet Hugues C. Pernath. The award is given every other year by the Hugues C. Pernathfonds to a Dutch-language poet no older than 43 years of age. The reason for this restriction is because Hugues C. Pernath, pseudonym of Hugo Wouters, died a few weeks before his 44th birthday.

Winners 

 1976: Annie Reniers, Nieuwe geboorte
 1980: Leonard Nolens, Alle tijd van de wereld
 1985: Leopold M. Van den Brande, De nabijheid van spiegels
 1988: Dirk van Bastelaere, Pornschlegel en andere gedichten
 1991: Erik Spinoy, Susette
 1993: Herman Leenders, Ogentroost
 1995: Luuk Gruwez, Vuile manieren
 1997: Miguel Declercq, Person@ges
 2001: Esther Jansma, Dakruiters
 2003: Jan Lauwereyns, Buigzaamheden
 2005: Ramsey Nasr, Onhandig bloesemend
 2007: Alfred Schaffer, Schuim
 2009: Arnoud van Adrichem, Vis
 2011: Marije Langelaar, De schuur in
 2013: Ingmar Heytze, Ademhalen onder de maan
 2015: Maud Vanhauwaert, Wij zijn evenwijdig

Notes

References

External links 
 Pernarthprijs (in Dutch), Hugues C. Pernath-Fonds

Belgian literary awards
Awards established in 1976
1976 establishments in Belgium